Robert Lee Mabe (October 8, 1929 – January 9, 2005) was an American professional baseball player, a right-handed pitcher who appeared in all or parts of three Major League Baseball seasons with the 1958 St. Louis Cardinals, 1959 Cincinnati Reds and the 1960 Baltimore Orioles.

Mabe was a 28-year-old veteran of minor league baseball when he made his MLB debut for the Cardinals in 1958. He had won 37 games for the 1955–1956 Houston Buffaloes of the Class AA Texas League. All told, he won 93 games during a ten-year minor league career.

As a Major Leaguer, Mabe appeared in 51 games played, including 14 as a starting pitcher. He won seven, lost 11 (.389) with 82 strikeouts in 142 innings pitched.

He died at age 75 in his hometown of Danville, Virginia.

References

1929 births
2005 deaths
Allentown Cardinals players
Baltimore Orioles players
Baseball players from Virginia
Charleston Senators players
Cincinnati Reds players
Houston Buffaloes players
Major League Baseball pitchers
Miami Marlins (IL) players
Minor league baseball players
Omaha Cardinals players
Reidsville Luckies players
Rock Hill Chiefs players
Rutherford County Owls players
St. Louis Cardinals players
Seattle Rainiers players
Sportspeople from Danville, Virginia